The Ministry of Health of Ukraine (МОЗ) is the main healthcare body in the system of central government of Ukraine. It is based on former Ministries of Healthcare.

The ministry consists of the central body headed the Minister of Healthcare and deputies to assist the minister. Ministry deputies elect several state healthcare administrations employee that specialize in certain field and coordinate operation of the government companies.

List of ministers

Structure

Central executive authorities 
 State Service for Medications and Drugs Control
 National Health Service of Ukraine

See also
Cabinet of Ministers of Ukraine
Minister of Healthcare (Ukraine)
Healthcare in Ukraine

References

External links 
 Official Website of the Ukrainian Ministry of Education

Healthcare
Healthcare
Ukraine
2010 establishments in Ukraine
Health in Ukraine